Life in a Fishbowl (literally Hope Street) is a 2014 Icelandic drama film directed by Baldvin Zophoníasson. It was screened in the Discovery section of the 2014 Toronto International Film Festival. It was selected as the Icelandic entry for the Best Foreign Language Film at the 87th Academy Awards, but was not nominated.

Plot 
The movie follows three people living in Reykjavik in 2006. Eik, a kindergarten teacher and mother struggling to make money thus working as part time as a prostitute, Sölvi, a former athlete who now in the corporate world and Móri, an older man struggling with alcoholism.

Cast
 Hera Hilmar as Eik
 Thor Kristjansson as Sölvi
 Ingvar Þórðarson as Hannes
 Sveinn Ólafur Gunnarsson as Gústi
 Þorsteinn Bachmann as Móri
 Laufey Elíasdóttir as Aníta
 Birgir Örn Steinarsson as Rakari / Barber
 Markus Reymann as Gerald

See also
 List of submissions to the 87th Academy Awards for Best Foreign Language Film
 List of Icelandic submissions for the Academy Award for Best Foreign Language Film

References

External links
 

2014 films
2014 drama films
Films scored by Ólafur Arnalds
2010s Icelandic-language films
Febiofest award winners
Icelandic drama films
Films set in the Great Recession
Films about prostitution
Films about child sexual abuse